72 Hours may refer to:

 72 Hours: True Crime, Canadian television series
 "72 Hours" (The Killing), second-season episode of television series The Killing
 "72 Hours", fifth-season episode of sitcom The Golden Girls (see List of The Golden Girls episodes)
 72 Hours (TV series), a 2013 reality television series on TNT
72 Hours: Martyr Who Never Died, Indian 2019 film